Daniel Paul (born August 16, 1943 in Plourivo) is a French politician who was a member of the National Assembly of France.  He represented Seine-Maritime's 8th constituency, and was a member of the Gauche démocrate et républicaine.

References

1943 births
Living people
People from Côtes-d'Armor
French Communist Party politicians
Deputies of the 12th National Assembly of the French Fifth Republic
Deputies of the 13th National Assembly of the French Fifth Republic
Chevaliers of the Légion d'honneur
Politicians from Normandy